William Raymond Keith (October 24, 1929 – January 30, 2009) was an American businessman and politician.

Biography
Born in Jackson, Michigan, Keith served in the United States Army. He went to the University of Michigan School of Banking. Keith was involved in the banking business and lived in Garden City, Michigan. He served on the Garden City Board of Education. Keith served in the Michigan House of Representatives from 1973 to 1982 and from 1993 to 1994. He was a Democrat. He died on January 30, 2009.

References 

1929 births
2009 deaths
People from Jackson, Michigan
People from Garden City, Michigan
Military personnel from Michigan
University of Michigan alumni
Businesspeople from Michigan
School board members in Michigan
Democratic Party members of the Michigan House of Representatives
20th-century American politicians
20th-century American businesspeople